Junaid Muhammad Junaid (born 1990) is a Yemeni poet. He worked as a teacher in Aden. His first book of poetry was called A Garland for a Qaitbani Woman. And was translated into English and included in a 1988 anthology on modern Arabian literature.

References

Yemeni poets
1955 births
Living people
Date of birth missing (living people)